Count Richard von Belcredi (12 February 1823 – 2 December 1902) was an Austrian civil servant and statesman, who served as Minister-President
(and 'Minister of State') of the Austrian Empire from 1865 to 1867. During 1881–1895, Belcredi was President of the Cisleithanian Administrative Court.

Life
Richard Graf von Belcredi was born on 12 February 1823, in Jimramov (Ingrowitz), in the Margraviate of Moravia, the youngest son of Count Eduard von Belcredi (1786–1838) and his wife Countess Maria von Fünfkirchen (1790–1860). He had one sister, Countess Almeria (1819-1914), who married Prince Hugo Maximilian von Thurn und Taxis (817-1889). The Belcredi noble family originally descended from Lombardy, where they had been vested with the estates of Montalto Pavese by the Sforza dukes of Milan. Count Richard's ancestors settled in Moravia from 1769 onwards.

He studied law at the universities of Prague and Vienna; in 1854, he was appointed district captain (Bezirkshauptmann) in Znojmo (Znaim). In 1861, he was elected member of the Landtag diet of Austrian Silesia and MP of the Imperial Council. He became head of the Austrian Silesian regional government one year later. In 1864, he was promoted to the official rank of Geheimrat (Secret Councillor) and appointed Imperial-Royal governor of Bohemia in Prague.

Three Count Ministry
In February 1865, Count Richard Belcredi, as the Austrian minister of state, convened a meeting of Viennese bankers to find ways to finance projects. In June 1865, Emperor Franz Josef I chose Belcredi, a declared Conservative, to become Prime Minister and Minister of State, replacing the government of Archduke Rainer Ferdinand of Austria and Anton von Schmerling, who had resigned after failure in his Liberal centralizing policies. Belcredi accepted his nomination, by his own accounts only from a sense of duty. His cabinet was called the "Three Count Ministry" although, actually, four counts were in charge: Minister President Belcredi himself, Alexander von Mensdorff-Pouilly as foreign minister, Johann Larisch von Moennich as finance minister, and Moritz Esterházy de Galantha as a minister without portfolio.

The Austrian government had to face the rising "Hungarian question", that eventually led to the Austro-Hungarian Compromise of 1867. On 20 September 1865, Belcredi had the 1861 February Patent suspended. Against delaying actions by Belcredi, the Compromise was achieved after the Austrian defeat in the Austro-Prussian War and the 1866 Peace of Prague, ending the monarchy's membership in the German Confederation. On October 30, Foreign Minister Mensdorff-Pouilly was succeeded by Friedrich Ferdinand von Beust who conducted the negotiations with Hungary and prepared a draft for the Cisleithanian December Constitution. 

Beust's concept of a Dual Monarchy finally prevailed against Belcredi's plans to implement a federation of the Austrian crown lands, similar to later proposals of United States of Greater Austria. On 7 February 1867, Belcredi handed in his resignation. In 1881 he was appointed president of the Imperial-Royal Administrative Court and life member of the Austrian House of Lords.

Orders and decorations
 :
 Grand Cross of the Royal Hungarian Order of St. Stephen, 1867
 Knight of the Order of the Golden Fleece, 1878
  Kingdom of Prussia: Knight of the Royal Order of the Crown, 1st Class, 29 July 1864

Notes

References
 "Belcredi, Richard Graf" (bio), aeiou Encyclopedia, 2008, webpage: AEIOU-Belcredi.
 Ludwig Graf Belcredi, "Fragmente aus dem Nachlasse des ehemaligen Staatsministers Grafen Richard Belcredi" ("Fragments from the Literary Legacy of Former Minister Count Richard Belcredi"), in: Die Kultur. Vierteljahresschrift für Wissenschaft, Literatur und Kunst 7 (1906).

External links 
 Otto 
 "Belcredi, Richard Graf" (bio), aeiou Encyclopedia, 2008, webpage: AEIOU-Belcredi.
 Staatsminister wider Willen (Hrsg.: Parlamentskorrespondenz, Wien 2001)

1823 births
1902 deaths
People from Jimramov
People from the Margraviate of Moravia
Counts of Austria
Moravian-German people
19th-century Ministers-President of Austria
Members of the Austrian House of Deputies (1861–1867)
Members of the House of Lords (Austria)
Members of the Diet of Austrian Silesia
Members of the Bohemian Diet
Austrian Empire politicians
Grand Crosses of the Order of Saint Stephen of Hungary
Knights of the Golden Fleece of Austria